Sila Vaifale (born 5 July 1967) is a former Samoan rugby union player. He made his international debut for  against  in Bucharest on October 14, 1989. Vaifale made his last appearance for Samoa against  in Apia on July 5, 1997.

The most memorable highlight of his career was when he scored the second try that helped Samoa defeat  at the 1991 Rugby World Cup, 16–13. Vaifale was also a member of the 1995 Rugby World Cup.
As part of the Samoan national team, he also played at the 1995 Rugby World Cup [6], was involved in the games of the Samoa sevens team at the 1993 and 1997 World Cups.

He currently holds one of the posts in the West Apia Rugby Union  and oversees the Samoa youth rugby teams.

References

External links
 

1967 births
Samoa international rugby union players
Rugby union flankers
Hawke's Bay rugby union players
Living people
People from Tuamasaga